Panamerican records in athletics are the best marks set in an athletics event by an athlete who competes for a member federation of the APA. APA doesn't maintain an official list for such performances. All bests shown on this list are tracked by statisticians not officially sanctioned by the governing body.

For these Athletes World Athletics maintain official Area Records, in this case North America, Central America and Caribbean Records and South American Records.

Outdoor

Key to tables:

+ = en route to longer distance

h = hand timing

at = automatic timing

≠ = annulled by IAAF due to doping violation, but nevertheless ratified by USATF

X = annulled due to doping violation

A = affected by altitude

a = aided road course according to IAAF rule 260.28

OT = oversized track (> 200 m in circumference)

Men

Women

Mixed

Indoor

Men

Women

Notes

References

Panamerican
Athletics